Renato Gojković (born 10 September 1995) is a Bosnian professional footballer who plays as a centre-back for Russian Premier League club Orenburg.

Club career
Gojković went through all the ranks of the Sloboda Tuzla academy, debuting for the first team in the First League of FBiH at the age of 16. At the age of 17, he joined Bosnian Premier League club Čelika Zenica in the summer of 2013.

After two years at Čelik, in the summer of 2015, Gojković joined 1. HNL side Istra 1961. He made his first team debut for the club coming in the 90th minute of the 20 September 2015 0–0 away draw against Slaven Belupo for Darko Mišić.

In 2018, after 3 years, he left Istra and joined Albanian Superliga club Partizani Tirana. On 17 December 2018, after playing only 4 league games in the 2018–19 Albanian Superliga, Gojković left the club after not being satisfied with his playing time.

On 9 January 2019, he came back to Bosnia and Herzegovina and signed a one and a half year contract with Bosnian Premier League club Zrinjski Mostar. He scored his first goal for Zrinjski on 4 May 2019, in a 1–1 home league draw against Radnik Bijeljina. Gojković left Zrinjski on 11 June 2020 after his contract with the club expired.

International career
Gojković played for both the Bosnia and Herzegovina U19 and the U21 national teams, making 3 appearances for both teams respectively.

Career statistics

References

External links

1995 births
Sportspeople from Tuzla
Living people
Association football central defenders
Bosnia and Herzegovina footballers
Bosnia and Herzegovina youth international footballers
Bosnia and Herzegovina under-21 international footballers
FK Sloboda Tuzla players
NK Čelik Zenica players
NK Istra 1961 players
FK Partizani Tirana players
HŠK Zrinjski Mostar players
FC Orenburg players
First League of the Federation of Bosnia and Herzegovina players
Premier League of Bosnia and Herzegovina players
Croatian Football League players
Kategoria Superiore players
Russian First League players
Russian Premier League players
Bosnia and Herzegovina expatriate footballers
Bosnia and Herzegovina expatriate sportspeople in Croatia
Expatriate footballers in Croatia
Bosnia and Herzegovina expatriate sportspeople in Albania
Expatriate footballers in Albania
Bosnia and Herzegovina expatriate sportspeople in Russia
Expatriate footballers in Russia